Line 8 of the Beijing Subway is a rapid transit line in Beijing. It sits on the central axis of Beijing. Line 8's color is green.

Route

North Section

Apart from the Zhuxinzhuang station and an  section of elevated track leading therefrom, the entire line runs underground.

Central Section
Three stations (and ) on the central section opened on 31 December 2021.

South Section
All stations are underground, except for Demao and Yinghai stations, which are elevated.

Stations

History
Line 8 has been planned and built in several phases.

Phase I (Olympic Branch Line)
Line 8 was planned as the subway line that follows Beijing's central north–south axis. This section was included in Beijing's bid for the 2008 Summer Olympics, which was awarded to the city in 2001. Originally, Beijing's subway planners also considered building a subway extension line off of Line 13 or Line 5 to serve the Olympic Green but ultimately chose to build Line 8 as a branch off of Line 10. Construction began in 2004. With other Olympic venues also under construction, Phase I of Line 8 was built using the cut-and-cover method to reduce the difficulty of construction. The Olympic Branch Line, as Line 8 Phase I was known, entered into operation together with Line 10 on July 19, 2008. It serves the Olympic Green, located due north of the city centre, during the 2008 Summer Olympics. The Phase I only included 4 stations. Access was originally restricted to riders with an Olympic Register Card or a ticket to an event at the Olympic Games or Paralympic Games on the day of the event. In early October 2008, the line was fully opened to the public.

Phase II
On December 8, 2007, while Phase I of Line 8 was still under construction, work began on Phase II to extend Line 8 in both directions along the city's north–south central axis.  In Phase II was estimated to cost ¥10.1 billion and was scheduled to be completed by 2012.

Northern extension to Huilongguan Dongdajie
The northern extension to Huilongguan Dongdajie,  in length with 6 stations, extended Line 8 from the South Gate of Forest Park to Huilongguan Dongdajie in Changping District beyond the Line 13 arc. Land clearing for Phase II began in December 2007.  Tunnel boring machines began work on October 16, 2009. In the fall of 2011, the entire Line 8 shut down and the entire line including the Phase II northern extension reopened on December 31, 2011.

The Lincuiqiao station, just west of the Olympic Forest Park, was originally planned as an emergency stop, but was added at the behest of nearby residents and their municipal people's congress representative, Tian Yuan, who argued that the  gap between South Gate of Forest Park and Yongtaizhuang made subway access inconvenient for residents along Lincui Road.  Lincuiqiao was officially added as a station to Phase II plans in December 2008.

Southern extension to Guloudajie
The southern extension to Guloudajie,  in length, opened on December 30, 2012.  Travel time from Huilongguan to the Second Ring Road was reduced by a half-hour.  Daily ridership reached 203,000 in March 2013.

Phase II sections opened at the end of 2013
On December 28, 2013, Line 8 reached  in length with the opening of the Changping-Line 8 Connector and the southern extension to Nanluoguxiang.

Changping-Line 8 Connector

The Changping-Line 8 Connector, also known as the Changba Connector Line (昌八联络线) or Changba Connector, is a  extension of Line 8 from Huilongguan Dongdajie to Zhuxinzhuang on the Changping Line. The Changba Connector contains three stations: Pingxifu, Yuzhilu and Zhuxinzhuang, and forms the northernmost section of Line 8.  The Changba Connector was designed to alleviate passenger traffic on Line 13 by allowing Changping Line riders heading to destinations in eastern Beijing to switch to Line 8 at Zhuxingzhuang instead of transferring to Line 13 at Xi'erqi.  The connector was built from April 2011 to September 2013 and entered operation at the end of 2013.

Southern extension to Nanluoguxiang
South of Guloudajie, Line 8 was extended a further  through  station to  station on December 28, 2013.

Phase II southern extension to National Art Museum
The one-station extension from Nanluoguxiang to National Art Museum was opened on 30 December 2018.

Phase III & IV
In Phase III & IV, Line 8 will be extended further south from the National Art Museum through Qianmen and Yongdingmen to beyond the southern 5th Ring Road. The line will veer to the east of the central axis to avoid passing under the Forbidden City and Tian'anmen Square, before returning to the central axis alignment at Qianmen.

Planning began in 2009. Phase III includes 14 stations and Phase IV includes 2 stations, Demao and Yinghai. Phase III was scheduled to be built by 2015 but the commencement of construction was not set to begin until October 2013.

On 30 December 2018, the southernmost section of Phase III, and Phase IV, from Zhushikou to Yinghai was opened (12 stations were opened, Dahongmen was not opened).

Future Development

Through service with Changping line
Through service between Line 8 and Changping line via Zhuxinzhuang station is under planning.

Southern extension
The extension is entirely in Daxing District of Beijing.

Opening timeline

Rolling Stock
During the Olympics Line 8 borrowed DKZ15 trains from Line 10; after the opening of the first sections of Phase II new CSR Sifang Locomotive SFM12 trains dedicated to Line 8 were rolled out.

References

Sources

External links

 Official Beijing Subway Website
 Line 8 Phase II Information Page at the Beijing Infrastructure Investment Co. Ltd.

Beijing Subway lines
Siemens Mobility projects
Railway lines opened in 2008
2008 establishments in China
750 V DC railway electrification